Clayborne Carson (born June 15, 1944) is an American academic who is a professor of history at Stanford University and director of the Martin Luther King, Jr., Research and Education Institute. Since 1985, he has directed the Martin Luther King Papers Project, a long-term project to edit and publish the papers of Martin Luther King Jr.

Early life and education

Carson was born on June 15, 1944, in Buffalo, New York; son of Clayborne and Louise Carson. He grew up near Los Alamos, New Mexico, where his was one of a small number of African-American families. He attributes his lifelong interest in the Civil Rights Movement to that experience. "I had this really strong curiosity about the black world, because in Los Alamos the black world was a very few families. When the civil rights movement started, I had this real fascination with it, and I wanted to meet the people in it."

After graduating from Los Alamos High School in 1962, Carson attended the University of New Mexico for his first year on college during the 1962–1963 school year. At age 19, Carson met Stokely Carmichael at a national student conference in Indiana. Carmichael convinced him to attend the March on Washington For Jobs and Freedom as a member of the Student Nonviolent Coordinating Committee (SNCC, pronounced "snick"). On August 28, 1963, Carson was overwhelmed to find himself among hundreds of thousands of African Americans at the March. This was the first big thing Carson had done in contribution to the Civil Rights Movement. Recalling the March, at which Dr. Martin Luther King Jr. delivered his famous "I Have a Dream" speech at the Lincoln Memorial, Carson says, "I have a lot of vivid memories, but not of King's speech." What left the biggest impression, he says, were "the people I met there." The March was also the only time Carson had ever heard Dr. King speak in public.

It wasn't until 1964 after Carson had transferred to the University of California, Los Angeles (UCLA)the he became more active in what he calls the "northern version of the southern struggle", and continued with SNCC. At UCLA Carson Changed his field of study from computer programming to American History. Here he earned his B.A. (1967), M.A. (1971), and wrote his doctoral dissertation on Stokely Carmichael and SNCC which earned him his Ph.D. (1975). While studying at UCLA, he was also involved with anti-Vietnam War protests. He speaks of that experience in his current writing, highlighting the importance of grassroots political activity within the African-American freedom struggle.

Career 
Carson has been a professor at Stanford University for more than 40 years, where he primarily teaches U.S. History and African American History. Carson has taught and lectured in Britain, France, China, South Africa, Zimbabwe, Tanzania, and throughout the United States. He teaches and lectures about Martin Luther King, Malcolm X, the Student Nonviolent Coordinating Committee (SNCC), the Black Panther Party, and other subjects related to the black struggle and civil rights. He has been a frequent guest on Pacifica Radio station KPFA in Berkeley, California, and has also appeared on programs like NPR's Fresh Air, the Tavis Smiley Show, the Charlie Rose Show, Good Morning America, and the CBS Evening News. Carson is a member of the global council of the California International Law Center at the University of California, Davis School of Law. Carson is also a member of several professional organizations including: the American Historical Association (AHA), the Organization of American Historians (OAH), the Social Science History Association (SSAH), the Association for the Study of Afro-American Life and History (ASAALH), and the Southern Historical Association.

Carson has also written several books and articles regarding the Civil Rights Movement, and has made contributions to many more as well as documentaries, and interviews. His first book In Struggle: and the Black Awakening of the 1960s was awarded the Fredrick Jackson Turner Award in 1982. Carson was also the Historical Adviser for the film Freedom on My Mind, which in 1995 was nominated for an Oscar.

In 1985, Coretta Scott King asked Carson to lead a project to publish King's previously unpublished works. In an interview conducted in 2008, Carson explains that he initially declined to work as Senior Editor to Dr. King's works, Carson had "never really thought of [himself] as a King biographer. [He] was a SNCC person," he said, referencing the discord between SNCC and Dr. King that occurred during the movement. Carson eventually agreed to oversee the project mentioning that he would not have accepted the job if the family held control over Dr. King's works. Carson and his staff has spent over 20 years working to edit and publish Dr. King's works.

On April 3, 2018, Clayborne Carson, as the director of the MLK Research and Education Institute, hosted a screening of a documentary that he helped create called I'm MLK, Jr. After the screening he hosted an additional event celebrating the 50th anniversary of Martin Luther King Jr.'s last speech, "I've Been to the Mountaintop".

In 2021, Carson was nominated by President Joe Biden to serve as a member of the newly formed Civil Rights Cold Case Records Review Board.

Personal life

Carson married Susan Ann Beyer in 1967, who at the time was a librarian. Until her retirement, she was the managing editor of the King Papers Project, and lives in Palo Alto, California. He has a daughter and son.

Awards and achievements 

Andrew Mellon Fellowship (1977)
Fredrick Jackson Turner Award of the organization of American Historians for In Struggle:SNCC and the Black Awakening of the 1960s (1982)
Rosa Park Distinguished Citizen Award, Martin Luther King, Jr., Association of Santa Clara Valley (1991)
Society of American Historians; elected member (1991)
Center for Advanced Study in Behavioral Sciences Fellowship (1991)
Honorary Doctorate from Pacific Graduate School of Psychology (1995)
Founders Award for Historical Scholarship from the Historical Society of Pennsylvania (2000)
International design competition for the National Martin Luther King Jr. Memorial in Washington D.C; winning team member (2000)
Gandhi King Ikeda Award from Martin Luther King, Jr. International Chapel, Gandhi Institute for reconciliation, Morehouse College, Atlanta (2004)
Commendation Resolution by California Legislative Black Caucus, California Assembly, Sacramento (2007)
Honorary Doctorate from Morehouse College (2007)
Honorary Doctorate from Niagara University (2008)
Martin Luther King, Jr. Research Fellowship from Howard Gotlieb Archival Center at Boston University (2009)
Community Leader Award from Peninsula Bay Chapter of The Links, Inc. (2010)
Local Hero of the Year Award from KQED/Union Bank (2011)
Joseph B, and Toby Gittler Prize from Brandeis University (2012)
Honorary Doctorate from Westminster College (2015)
Freedom Flame Award from Selma Bridge Crossing Jubilee, Inc. (2016)
Tikkun Award from the Network of Spiritual Progressives (2016)
Willie B. Kennedy Award from the Northern California Dr. Martin Luther King, Jr. Community Foundation (2018)
John W. Blassingame Award from the Southern Historical Association (2018)
Jamnalal Bajaj Foundation Award for promoting Gandhian values outside India (2018)

Select bibliography

Senior Academic Adviser "Eyes on the Prize" PBS,1987-1990.
co-editor, The Eyes on the Prize Civil Rights Reader. Penguin Books, 1991. 
Historical Adviser,"Freedom on My Mind" Tara Releasing, 1994.
 Co-editor with David Gallen, Malcolm X: the FBI file. Carroll & Graf Publishers, 1991. 
Co-author with Carol Berkin and others, American Voices A History of the United States. Scott Foresman and Company, 1992. 
co-author, A Knock at Midnight: Inspiration from the Great Sermons of Reverend Martin Luther King, Jr. Grand Central Publishers, 1998. 
co-author, The Autobiography of Martin Luther King, Jr. Grand Central Publishers, 2001. 
co-editor, African American Lives: The Struggle for Freedom. Volume I. Longman, 2004. 
co-editor, African American Lives: The Struggle for Freedom. Volume II. Longman, 2004. 
co-author, The Martin Luther King, Jr. Encyclopedia. Greenwood Press, 2008. 
senior editor, The Papers of Martin Luther King, Jr.. Vols. 1–4. University of California Press, 1992–2007.
co-editor with Kris Shepard, A Call to Conscience: The Landmark Speeches of Dr. Martin Luther King, Jr."   Warner Books, Inc., 2001. 
consultant, Civil Rights Chronicle : the African-American Struggle for Freedom Publications International, Ltd., 2003. Martin's Dream: My Journey and the Legacy of Martin Luther King Jr. A Memoir. Palgrave MacMillan, 2013. 

Historical Adviser, "Chicano! History of Mexican American Civil Rights" NLCC Educational Media, 1996 .
Historical Adviser, "Black and Jews" 1997 .
co-author, "Blacks and Jews in the Civil Rights Movement," in Strangers and Neighbors: Relations between Blacks and Jews in the United States, University of Massachusetts Press, 2000. 
Author of introduction, Stride Toward Freedom: Montgomery Story. Beacon Press, 2010. 
Co-Author, This Light is Ours: Activist Photographs of the Civil Rights Movement. WW Norton & Co, 2009. 
Author of play Passages of Martin Luther King.'' 1993

References

External links
 Clayborne Carson Home Page, Stanford University
 http://www.librarything.com/combine.php?author=carsonclayborne
 
 
 Interview with Tavis Smiley on January 15, 2007
 
 Interview with Clayborne Carson
https://twitter.com/claybornecarson?lang=en Carson's Twitter Page

1944 births
Activists for African-American civil rights
Activists from California
African-American academics
African-American non-fiction writers
American biographers
American book editors
21st-century American historians
21st-century American male writers
Anti–Vietnam War activists
Historians of the United States
Living people
American male biographers
Stanford University Department of History faculty
University of California, Los Angeles alumni
Academics from New York (state)
People from Los Alamos, New Mexico
Morehouse College faculty
American male non-fiction writers
Historians of the civil rights movement